Theodore Roosevelt, Rough Rider is a toppled bronze sculpture, not currently restored, by American artist Alexander Phimister Proctor, formerly located in the South Park Blocks of Portland, Oregon in the United States.  The equestrian statue was completed in 1922 and depicts Theodore Roosevelt as the leader of the cavalry regiment that fought during the Spanish–American War called the Rough Riders.

Description

Theodore Roosevelt, Rough Rider is an equestrian statue designed by American sculptor Alexander Phimister Proctor (1860–1950). The bronze sculpture depicts Theodore Roosevelt, former President of the United States, as the leader of the cavalry regiment called the Rough Riders, who fought during the Spanish–American War. According to the Regional Arts & Culture Council, which administers the work, "Proctor took great care in accurately depicting Roosevelt as a symbol of American determination, success, and strength and as a bridge back to the Wild West." The statue is located in Portland's South Park Blocks, along Southwest Park Avenue between Southwest Jefferson and Madison Streets.

History

The memorial was commissioned after Roosevelt's death. Completed in 1922, the sculpture was cast in Brooklyn, New York, and was shipped by sea via the Panama Canal to avoid cutting the work into pieces. Henry Waldo Coe, a friend and hunting partner of Roosevelt's, donated the statue to the City of Portland. Calvin Coolidge, then Vice President of the United States, was present at the statue's dedication.

The creation of the statue was documented by the Metropolitan Museum of Art in its 1922 film, The Making of a Bronze Statue.  This film was the first time that  the entire process of creating a bronze statue by the lost-wax method of casting was photographed.  The Metropolitan Museum of Art made this film available on Youtube in January of 2023.  https://www.youtube.com/watch?v=rPJZwlnw-rc

The statue's condition was deemed "treatment needed" by the Smithsonian Institution's "Save Outdoor Sculpture!" program in April 1993. It was toppled by rioters during the Indigenous Peoples Day of Rage in October 2020, along with the nearby statue of Abraham Lincoln, in what Portland police declared a riot.

On July 28, 2021, Stan Pulliam, the mayor of Sandy, Oregon, proposed to have the Roosevelt statue and two other Portland statues, one of Lincoln and one of Washington, reinstalled in Sandy, Oregon. He said: "When we heard last week that the city of Portland is considering not putting the statues back up we decided we're tired of the embarrassment". A decision on the future of the statues has not been made.

See also
 1922 in art
 List of equestrian statues in the United States
 List of monuments and memorials removed during the George Floyd protests
 List of sculptures of presidents of the United States
 Rough Riders Memorial (1907), Arlington National Cemetery

References

External links
 

1922 establishments in Oregon
1922 sculptures
Bronze sculptures in Oregon
Roosevelt, Theodore
Equestrian statues in Oregon
Military monuments and memorials in the United States
Monuments and memorials removed during the George Floyd protests
Outdoor sculptures in Portland, Oregon
Calvin Coolidge
Sculptures of men in Oregon
South Park Blocks
Statues by Alexander Phimister Proctor in Oregon
Statues in Portland, Oregon
Statues of Theodore Roosevelt
Statues removed in 2020
Vandalized works of art in Oregon